Aaadonta constricta babelthuapi is a subspecies of land snail, a terrestrial pulmonate gastropod mollusk in the family Endodontidae. It is endemic to Palau, where it was previously known from Babeldaob and Ngemelis. It is now only known from Ngatpang. It is threatened by destruction or modification of its habitat.

References

Endodontidae
Endemic fauna of Palau
Gastropods described in 1976